Fräschels railway station is a railway station in the municipality of Fräschels, in the Swiss canton of Fribourg. It is an intermediate stop on the standard gauge Palézieux–Lyss railway line of Swiss Federal Railways.

Services 
The following services stop at Fräschels:

References

External links 
 
 

Railway stations in the canton of Fribourg
Swiss Federal Railways stations